The Den Helder–Amsterdam railway is a railway line in the Netherlands running from Den Helder to Amsterdam, passing through Alkmaar and Zaandam. It is also called the Staatslijn K ("state line K") in Dutch. The line is 81 km long.

The following stations are on Staatslijn K:

 Den Helder
 Den Helder Zuid
 Anna Paulowna
 Schagen
 Heerhugowaard
 Alkmaar Noord
 Alkmaar
 Heiloo
 Castricum
 Uitgeest
 Krommenie-Assendelft
 Wormerveer
 Koog-Zaandijk
 Koog Bloemwijk
 Zaandam
 Amsterdam Sloterdijk
 Amsterdam Centraal

History

The line began construction on 18 August 1860 and on 18 December 1865 the first section opened.

The sections were opened on:

 18 December 1865 - Den Helder - Alkmaar
 1 May 1867 - Alkmaar - Uitgeest
 1 November 1869 - Uitgeest - Zaandam
 15 May 1878 - Zaandam - Amsterdam Willemspoort
 15 October 1878 - Amsterdam Willemspoort - Amsterdam Oosterdok

The line between Alkmaar and Amsterdam was electrified in 1931 and between Den Helder and Alkmaar in 1958.

The following stations were opened at the same time as the sections of the line were opened:

 Den Helder
 Anna Paulowna
 Schagen
 Noord Scharwoude
 Heerhugowaard
 Alkmaar
 Castricum
 Uitgeest
 Krommenie-Assendelft
 Wormerveer
 Koog-Zaandijk
 Zaandam
 Amsterdam Westerdok

Standard gauge railways in the Netherlands
Railway lines opened in 1865